Ooh La La La (stylized as ooh la la la) is a 2012 Indian Tamil-language film directed by Jyothi Krishna. The film, starring Jyothi Krishna along with Divya Bhandari released on 20 April 2012. The film's name is based on the song of the same name from Minsara Kanavu.

Cast
Jyothi Krishna as Surya
Divya Bhandari  as Preethi
Thalaivasal Vijay  as Surya's father
Ganja Karuppu
Rani as Surya's mother
Saai Sundar as Sathya

Soundtrack

Critical reception
Vivek Ramz of in.com rated Ooh La La La 2.5/5 calling it "a romantic entertainer" and added that it's worth a one time watch.

References

2012 films
2010s Tamil-language films
Films directed by Jyothi Krishna (director)